His & Hers is a 1997 American independent comedy film which premiered at the 1997 Sundance Film Festival. Written and directed by Hal Salwen, it is a modern screwball comedy, the plot of which centers around the accidental amputation of a finger.

Plot
While chopping carrots in her suburban kitchen, a nervous housewife, Carol (Caroleen Feeney), accidentally chops off her husband Glenn's (Liev Schreiber) pinky, causing the detached finger to fly out the window and into the backyard.  After chasing down the neighbor's dog, which has absconded with the errant digit, Carol eventually recovers it, But as the couple races to the hospital to have the finger reattached, Carol discovers that Glenn has been unfaithful.  Indignant, she decides that she is not giving it back until Glenn confesses to the identity of his affair.  After much hemming and hawing, Glenn eventually acknowledges that it is Pam (Cynthia Watros), who also just happens to be Carol's best friend.  Incensed, Carol drives to Pam's house to confront her, only to raise the ire of Pam's husband, Nick (Michael Rispoli), who grabs the finger and runs off, planning to put it into a bank deposit machine.

Cast
 Liev Schreiber as Glenn
 Caroleen Feeney as Carol
 Michael Rispoli as Nick
 Cynthia Watros as Pam
 Danny Hoch as Lenny
 N'Bushe Wright as Selena
 Joe Lisi as Captain Barillo
 Jodi Long as Corey Chang
 Jim Bracchitta as Chad Williamson
 David Warren Burke as Lt. Riley
 Gregory Burke as Lawn Mowing Kid
 John Callahan as Scott
 Ranjit Chowdhry as Taxi Driver
 Kathleen Claypool as Mrs. Kalinsky
 Sandra Holley as Physician's Assistant
 Steven Randazzo as Security Guard
 Joel Rooks as Bank Manager
 Hal Salwen as Pinky Surgeon

Reception

Critical response
Film critic Emanuel Levy of Variety wrote in his review:"Hal Salwen’s His and Hers, a screwball comedy about marital squabbling, is a disappointing follow-up to his charming, critically acclaimed debut, Denise Calls Up."

References

Citations

Sources

External links

1997 films
1990s screwball comedy films
1997 comedy films
1990s English-language films